"Blue Bossa" is a jazz standard by Kenny Dorham.

Blue Bossa may also refer to:

Blue Bossa (New York Unit album), 1990
Blue Bossa (McCoy Tyner album), 1991

See also
 Bossa (disambiguation)